Antillophos smithi is a species of sea snail, a marine gastropod mollusc in the family Nassariidae, the true whelks and the like.

Description

Distribution
This species occurs in the Atlantic Ocean off Brazil.

References

External links
 Petuch E. J. (2002). "New deep water gastropods from the Bimini Shelf, Bimini Chain, Bahamas". Ruthenica 12(1): 59–72. abstract
 Watters, G. T. (2009). A revision of the western Atlantic Ocean genera Anna, Antillophos, Bailya, Caducifer, Monostiolum, and Parviphos, with description of a new genus, Dianthiphos, and notes on Engina and Hesperisternia Gastropoda: Buccinidae: Pisaniinae) and Cumia (Colubrariidae). The Nautilus. 123(4): 225-275.

Nassariidae
Gastropods described in 2002